The 2019–20 season was Fenerbahçe's 106th season in the existence of the club. The team played in the Basketball Super League and in the Euroleague. In May 2020, the 2019–20 season was canceled due to the COVID-19 pandemic in the Basketball Super League and the EuroLeague.

Players

Squad information

Depth chart

Transactions

In

|}

Out

|}

Pre-season and friendlies

Friendly match

Competitions

Overview

Basketball Super League

League table

Results summary

Results by round

Matches

EuroLeague

League table

Results summary

Results by round

Matches

Individual awards
EuroLeague MVP of the Round
 Nando de Colo – Regular Season, Round 3
 Kostas Sloukas – Regular Season, Round 12

Turkish Basketball Cup

Quarterfinals

Semifinals

Final

Turkish Basketball Presidential Cup

Statistics

EuroLeague

Notes

References

2019-20
Fenerbahçe
Fenerbahçe